The South African Railways Class 10D 4-6-2 of 1910 was a steam locomotive from the pre-Union era in Transvaal.

In 1910, the Central South African Railways placed one American-built   Pacific type steam locomotive in service. When the South African Railways classification and renumbering took place in 1912, this locomotive was designated the sole member of Class 10D.

Manufacturer
One  Pacific type passenger locomotive was ordered by the Central South African Railways (CSAR) from the American Locomotive Company (ALCO) in 1910. It was built to very much the same specifications as that of the CSAR Class 10-2 of that same year, which was designed by CSAR Chief Mechanical Engineer (CME) G.G. Elliot.

The locomotive was slightly more powerful than the Class 10-2 and was designated Class 10 by the CSAR, with engine number 1002, along with the fifteen CSAR Class 10 4-6-2 locomotives which had been built by the North British Locomotive Company in 1904.

Characteristics
Reversing was effected by means of a screw gear. The locomotive had a Belpaire firebox and, instead of the usual deep bridle casting, was built with a shallow casting and frame under the firebox. This permitted all firebox stays to be removed without lifting the boiler from the frame.

The locomotive was superheated, using the Cole double-header superheater system. The Cole superheater was somewhat similar to the Schmidt superheater system, except that the Cole type had two headers arranged at either side of the smokebox instead of one at the top.

Each of the eighteen  diameter boiler flues contained four lengths of seamless steam pipes of  outside diameter, arranged in double pairs which were connected at the back ends by return bends and with the two pairs connected to each other at the front by another return bend. This forced the steam to traverse the entire four pipe lengths before entering the steam chests. The two free front ends of each such foursome of pipes were bent around to meet the steam headers.

South African Railways
When the Union of South Africa was established on 31 May 1910, the three Colonial government railways (Cape Government Railways, Natal Government Railways and CSAR) were united under a single administration to control and administer the railways, ports and harbours of the Union. Although the South African Railways and Harbours came into existence in 1910, the actual classification and renumbering of all the rolling stock of the three constituent railways were only implemented with effect from 1 January 1912.

In 1912, the sixteen CSAR Class 10 locomotives were renumbered on the South African Railways (SAR) roster. The fifteen older British-built locomotives retained their  designation on the SAR roster, but the ALCO-built engine was designated the sole member of Class 10D and renumbered 779.

Service
The Class 10D was placed in service on fast passenger work in the Transvaal and later in the Orange Free State. It spent its last working years at Bloemfontein until it was withdrawn from service in 1931 and scrapped.

References

1680
1680
4-6-2 locomotives
2′C1′ h2 locomotives
ALCO locomotives
Cape gauge railway locomotives
Railway locomotives introduced in 1910
1910 in South Africa
Scrapped locomotives